Durningen (Dürningen in German; Dírnínge in Alsatian) is a commune in the Bas-Rhin department and Grand Est region of north-eastern France.

It is the highest-situated commune in the Kochersberg natural region.

The name is first recorded in 724 as Deorangus, subsequently as Teuringas (742), Thurinca (787), Thuringen (1276), and finally Turningen / Durningen (1371).

In the Middle Ages, Durningen was part of the domain of Hanau-Lichtenberg and belonged to the Prince-Bishopric of Strasbourg.

See also
 Communes of the Bas-Rhin department

References

External links

Official site

Communes of Bas-Rhin